Garcinia lanceifolia is an endemic medicinal evergreen plant with edible fruit native to Asia, India, Bangladesh, Myanmar. It has been used by various ethnic communities across North-Eastern India for treatment of dysentery, dyspepsia and biliousness etc. It is also used as pickles in various North Eastern Indian cuisines.

It is locally known as 'Rupohi Thekera' (ৰূপহী থেকেৰা) or 'Kon Thekera' (কণ- থেকেৰা) in Assamese, Chengkek in Mizo, Thisuru in Garo, Dieng-soh-jadu in Khasi and Khanada.

References

External links
 Garcinia lanceifolia Roxb.

Edible fruits
Fruits originating in Asia
lanceifolia
Tropical fruit
Crops
Fruit trees
Plant dyes